Marinobacter litoralis is a Gram-negative, non-spore-forming, moderately halophilic and motile bacterium from the genus of Marinobacter which has been isolated from sea water from the Sea of Japan.

References

External links
Type strain of Marinobacter litoralis at BacDive -  the Bacterial Diversity Metadatabase

Further reading 
 <

Alteromonadales
Bacteria described in 2003